Simpang Ampat or Simpang Empat or Sempang Ampat is a small town in Alor Gajah District, Malacca, Malaysia.

Education

Tourist attractions

References

Towns in Malacca